Saussure or de Saussure may refer to:
 Saussure (crater), a lunar crater
 13580 de Saussure, an asteroid

Surname 
People of the surname Saussure or de Saussure include

 Horace-Bénédict de Saussure (1740–1799), Genevan physicist and Alpine traveller
 Nicolas-Théodore de Saussure (1767–1845), chemist, son of Horace-Bénédict, and brother of Albertine
 Albertine Necker de Saussure (1766–1841), Swiss writer, educationalist, and advocate of education for women, daughter of Horace-Bénédict, and sister of Nicolas-Théodore
 Henri Louis Frédéric de Saussure (1829–1905), Swiss mineralogist and entomologist (taxonomist), and father of Ferdinand, Léopold and René.
 Ferdinand de Saussure (1857–1913), Swiss linguist, brother of Léopold and René
 Léopold de Saussure  (1866–1925), sinologist, astronomer, French Naval Officer, brother of Ferdinand and René
  (1901–1984), female sailing pioneer and scholar, specialist of Jean-Jacques Rousseau, daughter of Léopold and mother of Delphine Seyrig
 René de Saussure (1868–1943), Swiss Esperantist and scientist, brother of Ferdinand and Léopold
 Raymond de Saussure (1894–1971), Swiss psychoanalyst
  (1925–2007), Swiss artist and member of the Taizé Community
 Henry William de Saussure  (1763–1839) American lawyer, State legislator from South Carolina, President of the U.S. Mint
 William F. De Saussure (1792–1870), U.S. Senator from South Carolina